Yuriy Leonidovych Solovyenko (born 20 January 1971 in Kiev, Ukrainian SSR) is a professional Ukrainian football coach and a former defender.

He was a head coach in FC Nyva Vinnytsia and assistant coach to Iurie Blonari and Vlad Goian in FC Tiraspol. In Nyva Vinnytsia Solovyenko often worked along with Volodymyr Reva.

References

External links

1971 births
Footballers from Kyiv
Living people
Soviet footballers
Ukrainian footballers
FC Nyva Vinnytsia players
FC Metalurh Donetsk players
FC Metalurh-2 Donetsk players
FC Mariupol players
FC Illichivets-2 Mariupol players
Hapoel Jerusalem F.C. players
Ukrainian expatriate footballers
Expatriate footballers in Israel
Ukrainian expatriate sportspeople in Israel
Association football defenders
Ukrainian football managers
Expatriate football managers in Moldova
FC Nyva Vinnytsia managers